James Conacher (May 5, 1921 – April 9, 2020) was a Scottish-born Canadian  ice hockey forward. He played in the National Hockey League with the Detroit Red Wings, Chicago Black Hawks, and New York Rangers between 1945 and 1952. Conacher was born in Motherwell, Scotland, United Kingdom and raised in Toronto, Ontario.

Life and career
Conacher started his National Hockey League career with the Detroit Red Wings. He went on to play with the New York Rangers and Chicago Black Hawks. Conacher recorded 85 goals and 117 assists for 202 points in 328 career NHL games. After his hockey career, he worked as an advertising salesman for newspaper companies in Toronto. After Chick Webster's death in January 2018, he became the oldest living former NHL player.

Conacher was married to Bonnie, who died November 2013. He later resided in West Vancouver, British Columbia. The couple were active in the Vancouver Lions Gate Hospital Foundation. Conacher died on April 9, 2020 at the age of 98.

Career statistics

Regular season and playoffs

See also
 List of National Hockey League players from the United Kingdom

References

External links
 

1921 births
2020 deaths
Buffalo Bisons (AHL) players
Canadian ice hockey centres
Chicago Blackhawks players
Detroit Red Wings players
Indianapolis Capitals players
Milwaukee Sea Gulls players
Naturalized citizens of Canada
New York Rangers players
Omaha Knights (AHA) players
Scottish emigrants to Canada
Ice hockey people from Toronto
Toronto Young Rangers players